Damore is a surname. Notable people with the surname include:

James Damore, author of Google's Ideological Echo Chamber
John Damore (born 1933), American football player
Nick Damore (1916–1969), Canadian ice hockey player

See also
D'Amore (disambiguation)